Pipra Dixit is a medium size village in Salempur tehsil of Deoria district Uttar pradesh, India.

Demography
According to the Population Census 2011, Pipra Diksit has total population 1,477 of which 801 are males while 676 are females. Average Sex Ratio of Pipra Diksit village is 844 and literacy rate of the village was 73.88%.

References

Villages in Deoria district